Rabbi Levi can refer to:
 Levi ben Sisi, a rabbi who lived during the transition between tannaim and amoraim
 Levi II, a third generation amora
 Gersonides (or Rabbi Levi ben Gershon), medieval rabbi and thinker
 Rabbi Levi (crater), an impact crater on the Moon